Georges Engrand (5 October 1852 – February 1936) was a French sculptor. His work was part of the sculpture event in the art competition at the 1924 Summer Olympics.

References

1852 births
1936 deaths
19th-century French sculptors
20th-century French sculptors
French male sculptors
Olympic competitors in art competitions
People from Aire-sur-la-Lys
19th-century French male artists